The silver dory (Cyttus australis) is a dory, in the genus Cyttus, found around southern Australia, on the continental shelf at depths of between 10 and 350 m.  Its length is about 40 cm.

References

 
 

Cyttidae
Fish described in 1843